The 2017 Spielberg GP3 Series round was the second round of the 2017 GP3 Series. It was held on 8 and 9 July 2017 at Red Bull Ring in Spielberg, Austria. The race supported the 2017 Austrian Grand Prix.

Classification

Qualifying

Feature Race

Sprint Race

Championship standings after the round

Drivers' Championship standings

Teams' Championship standings

 Note: Only the top five positions are included for both sets of standings.

Notes

References

|- style="text-align:center"
|width="35%"|Previous race:
|width="30%"|GP3 Series2017 season
|width="40%"|Next race:

Spielberg
GP3
GP3 Spielberg